Karl Wilhelm Svensson (born 21 March 1984) is a Swedish former professional footballer who played as a centre-back for Jönköpings Södra, IFK Göteborg, Rangers, and Caen. He won one cap for the Sweden national team and represented his country at the 2006 FIFA World Cup.

Club career

Early career 
Karl Svensson started off his professional career with his boyhood club Jönköpings Södra, and signed with the IFK Göteborg ahead of the 2003 Allsvenskan season. He was a part of the IFK Göteborg team that reached the 2004 Svenska Cupen final, but ultimately lost 3–1 to Djurgårdens IF. Svensson was sent off in the final after picking up two yellow cards.

Rangers 
Svensson signed with the Scottish Glasgow-side Rangers on 26 May 2006 for an undisclosed fee on a three–year contract. The fee was reported to have been in the region of £600,000. He made his Rangers debut in the first match of the Scottish Premier League that season, a 2–1 victory away against Motherwell. He made a total of 27 Scottish Premier League appearances during his time with the Rangers, but rarely played from February 2007 and onward.

Caen 
On 27 June 2007, Svensson signed a three–year contract with French side Caen, newly promoted to Ligue 1. His time in France was plagued with injuries and little playing time.

Return to Sweden 
On 19 January 2009, Svensson signed a four–year contract with his former club IFK Göteborg. On 23 December 2011, he signed a three-year contract with his hometown club Jönköpings Södra IF in the Swedish second division, Superettan. Svensson retired from professional football after the 2014 Superettan season.

International career 
After having represented the Sweden national U17, U19, and U21 teams, Svensson made his first and only full international appearance for the Sweden national team in January 2006 against Saudi Arabia. He was a part of Sweden's 2006 FIFA World Cup squad, but did not play.

References

External links

1984 births
Living people
Swedish footballers
Association football central defenders
Sweden international footballers
Sweden youth international footballers
Sweden under-21 international footballers
2006 FIFA World Cup players
Ligue 1 players
Allsvenskan players
Jönköpings Södra IF players
IFK Göteborg players
Rangers F.C. players
Stade Malherbe Caen players
Scottish Premier League players
Swedish expatriate footballers
Swedish expatriate sportspeople in the United Kingdom
Swedish expatriate sportspeople in Scotland
Expatriate footballers in Scotland
Swedish expatriate sportspeople in France
Expatriate footballers in France
People from Jönköping
Sportspeople from Jönköping County